1,2-Butylene carbonate is an organic compound with formula , or (HC)(CH)(CO).  It is a double ester with the carbonate functional group bonded to both free ends of the 1,2-butylene group.  It is also a heterocyclic compound with a five-membered ring, and can be seen as a derivative of dioxolane, specifically 4-ethyl-1,3-dioxolan-2-one.

1,2-Butylene carbonate is a polar aprotic solvent, which has been considered for electric battery applications (as a cheaper alternative to ionic liquids) and many other uses.

See also
Propylene carbonate
trans-1,3-Butylene carbonate

References

Solvents
Carbonate esters